The Automata (German: Die Automate) is a short story written by E. T. A. Hoffmann. Originally published in 1814 in German language literary-culture journal Zeitung für die elegante Welt (Newspaper for the Elegant World), the full story was first published in his book Die Serapionsbrüder (The Serapion Brethren) in 1819.

Plot summary
The plot follows the discussions and retelling of several distinct stories, framed by an evening gathering between several men.

The narrator is invited to a small gathering, and arrives late. When he gets there, he encounters the silent party watching a gold ring swing back and forth, transfixed at the motion. His friend Vincent claims that the ring moves according to the will of the men in the room, which causes an argument among the guests. Another man, Cyprian, begins to tell one of his stories to prove the existence of the supernatural:

Cyprian's story takes place at the county house of Colonel von P———. During his time there, Cyprian meets the colonel's two daughters: the elder, Augusta, is a lovely woman and the picture of perfect health, while the younger, Adelgunda, is lovely but physically gaunt and naturally quiet. Cyprian notices that other members of the household try to attract attention away from Adelgunda as much as possible. The family especially tries to keep her hidden at nine at night, attributing it to her frailty. On the night of her birthday, Adelgunda hosts many of her friends, and offers to show them her impression of what she calls the White Lady. However, when the clock strikes nine, she is paralyzed, begins to cry out about a terrifying female figure that no one else can see, and faints. Every night on, Adelgunda claims to see this same figure, although no one else is able to see or feel it. Many doctors are called in, one who decides to trick Adelgunda's perception of time in order to investigate the link between her vision and the clock. The family sets the clock forward an hour without telling her, but that night she still goes into the same state she does every night at nine, even though the clock only strikes eight. To prove that the spirit is real, Adelgunda picks up a plate and lets it go, and the plate floats motionless in the air. Shocked, the mother dies in the ensuing days, Augusta becomes a shell of her former self, and the colonel dies in battle.

At the gathering, Cyprian finishes his story and the others begin to debate the validity of his story on various grounds. Theodore recounts the story of a musician he read about who was haunted by something playing on his piano at night with virtuosic skill. Eager to change the subject away from that of the supernatural, Lothair asks Ottmar to read a manuscript in his breast pocket in order to dispel the group's discussion. However, Theodore quickly interjects with a manuscript of his own, titled Automata, that he claims is tied:

The memo begins by describing an automaton called the Talking Turk that has been the talk of a town because of its very human appearance, the difficulty people have discovering its control mechanism, and the uncannily accurate advice and answers it gives, in many languages and attitudes, to its questioners. Lewis and Ferdinand, two college friends, decide to go see the Turk, although Lewis approaches with trepidation due to his experience with a wax museum when he was younger, while Ferdinand is eager to find whatever trick governs the Turk. When they reach its exhibit, they find that the Turk isn't answering the crowd's questions to their satisfaction. Ferdinand draws near to the Turk, exchanges some questions with it, grows pale, and then declares to the crowd that the Turk has answered as hoped. Returning to Lewis, Ferdinand says that there must be some spirit controlling the Turk, because he asked it about something he had never told anyone else about:

Some time ago, Ferdinand was staying in an inn next door to a woman with a beautiful singing voice. In his dreams, he imagined her calling out to him, that she was a childhood friend who he was destined to be with. Upon waking, he realized that she was not the same woman. An older man called her down to get in a carriage, and though Ferdinand and the woman locked eyes, she quickly set off in the carriage. Ferdinand painted a picture of her, which he kept in a locket on his chest. When he now asked the Turk about the singer, it said that the next time he saw her, he would be lost to her.

With Ferdinand dismayed by this answer, Lewis attempts to cheer him up. They learn of the creator of the Turk, Professor X———, and they decide to try to contact him, to learn more about his musical automatons and the mysteries behind the Turk's inner workings. They meet the professor, who puts on a performance for them, playing the piano accompanied by various machines playing instruments. Afterwards, Lewis and Ferdinand discuss at length their frustration with the artificiality of the performance.

Ferdinand leaves town after receiving a letter from his father. Several months later, he send a letter to Lewis saying that he has seen his singer, and has found out that she is to marry another man. Upon recognizing Ferdinand, she faints into the arms of Professor X———. Lewis finds this especially strange, since Professor X——— hasn't once left town in the intervening time. He wonders if the Turk's prophecy has in fact been fulfilled by psychic bonds making their way into everyday life.

Back at the gathering, Theodore finishes the story. Ottmar is frustrated at the loose ends, but Theodore assures him that the Talking Turk is meant to be merely a fragment. He reveals that the real Ferdinand is fine, as they have recently read one of his dialogues on opera. Lothair, contented with this ending, suggests they move on from their conversation about the Talking Turk.

Characters
 Characters at the gathering:
 The narrator, who arrives late to the evening gathering
 Vincent, a friend of the narrator
 Theodore
 Lothair
 Cyprian, teller of the story of Adelgunda
 Ottmar
 Characters in Cyprian's story:
 Colonel von P———
 His wife
 An elderly frenchwoman
 Augusta, the colonel's elder daughter
 Adelgunda, the colonel's younger daughter
 Characters in the Automata manuscript:
 The Turk's exhibitor
 Lewis
 Ferdinand
 The woman singer
 Professor X———, the Turk's creator

Historical significance
Some scholars argue that The Automata and Hoffmann's other stories have been to some extent overlooked in the study of early science fiction. Martin Willis explains that each part of the frame narrative (the gathering with the ring, the ghost story of Adelgunda, and the story of the Talking Turk) each explore different aspects of the inter-relatedness between scientific and supernatural ways of knowing in the early 19th century, and not necessarily in mutually exclusive ways.

Other critics note The Automata's early literary connection between the mechanical world of automation and the aesthetic world of music. Katherine Hirt draws on Hoffmann's musical training to explain the way in which the story critiques the mechanical production of sound, using the characters to support the limitations of human performance. Werner Keil points out how Ferdinand elevates the comparatively simple but human performance by the unnamed woman singer.

References

Short stories by E. T. A. Hoffmann